Premadasa is a Sinhalese name that may refer to the following people:
 
Surname
Hema Premadasa (born 1935), Sri Lankan politician and former First Lady of Sri Lanka
Ranasinghe Premadasa (1924–1993), Prime Minister and President of Sri Lanka
Sajith Premadasa (born 1967), Sri Lankan politician, the son of Hema and Ranasinghe Premadasa

See also

Premadasa cabinet (1989–1993)
R. Premadasa Stadium, Colombo, Sri Lanka
 

Sinhalese surnames